Sibawayh the phonologist: A critical study of the phonetic and phonological theory of Sibawayh as presented in his treatise Al-Kitab is a 1993 book by A. A. Al-Nassir in which the author examines the views of Sibawayh on phonology. The book is based on Al-Nassir's doctoral dissertation (1985) at the University of York under the supervision of John Kelly.

Reception
The book was reviewed by John McCarthy, Yasir Suleiman and M. G. Carter.

References

External links 
 Sibawayh the Phonologist

1993 non-fiction books
Phonology books
Books on linguistic typology
Arabic grammar books
History of linguistics
Theses